Larrison is a surname. Notable people with the surname include:

Harry Larrison, Jr. (1926–2005), American politician
Mike Larrison (born 1981), American racing driver
Preston Larrison (born 1980), American baseball player

See also
Garrison (name)
Harrison (name)